Dasysyrphus hilaris is a Palearctic hoverfly. It is a member of a cryptic species complex which includes Dasysyrphus venustus the most frequent and widely distributed species of the genus. Dasysyrphus hilaris is known with a level of certainty only from Ireland, Great Britain, Norway, France (Vosges, Alps, Pyrenees) and Liechtenstein.This species cannot be determined using existing keys.

References

Diptera of Europe
Syrphini
Insects described in 1843